Hale County This Morning, This Evening is a 2018 American documentary film about the lives of black people in Hale County, Alabama. It is directed by RaMell Ross and produced by RaMell Ross, Joslyn Barnes, Su Kim, and is Ross's first nonfiction feature. The documentary is the winner of 2018 Sundance Film Festival award for U.S. Documentary Special Jury Award for Creative Vision, 2018 Gotham Independent Film Award for Best Documentary Feature and the Cinema Eye Honors Outstanding Achievement in Nonfiction Feature Filmmaking. It was nominated for the Academy Award for Best Documentary Feature. After its theatrical run, it aired on the PBS series Independent Lens and eventually won a 2020 Peabody Award.

Summary
Lacking a linear storyline, Hale County This Morning, This Evening follows various inhabitants of Hale County in Alabama's Black Belt. Questions posited throughout as intertitles loosely structure the film. They are: “What is the orbit of our dreaming?”, “How do we not frame someone?” and “Whose child is this?”  Ross shared a list in Filmmaker Magazine of nonhierarchical aims and corresponding strategies to shape the film's avant-garde form including 'to centralize my new community in documentary's language of truth' and then to 'participate, not capture; shoot from not at' the community. The result is a non-fiction work that has the qualities of a visual orchestra, the 76 minute film following "the flow of five musical movements, as (Quincy) Bryant and (Daniel) Collins float in and out of frame, their lives progressing through college and fatherhood" Important to Ross' imagery in the film and his art practice is what he calls the epic-banal, "the magnificence of the universe’s encasement in the social, awaiting other forms", which he says is "the direct result of looking at photography and film in the context of representation and lack of representation... its tendency to sensationalize". The epic-banal is "an epic moment in something incredibly simple" that something can be profound, grandiose and deeply meaningful in the simple depictions of existence of Black people.

RaMell Ross said of the movie: "If we weren't stuck in our first-person points of view, I would argue that most problems in the world that have to do with inequality would be solved, because we wouldn't be stuck in our single points of views."

Critical reception
It scores 85 on Metacritic, indicating "universal acclaim". The Village Voice's Bilge Ebiri wrote "It’s not every day that you witness a new cinematic language being born, but watching RaMell Ross’s evocatively titled documentary Hale County This Morning, This Evening qualifies".

Glenn Kenny of The New York Times lauded Ross's "patient and focused eye. His camera’s gaze has a quality of reserve, one that insistently imparts respect to his subjects." Peter Bradshaw of The Guardian gave the film a full five stars and labelled it "visionary", while Owen Gleiberman of Variety called it a "transcendental scrapbook". Its racial politics were commended by Melissa Vincent of The Globe and Mail, stating "At every juncture, Ross elects for ambiguity and poses a question to the viewer to answer how black bodies are viewed, encouraging the audience to perform the labour of challenging their expectations." At The Atlantic Samantha N. Sheppard writes "Ross shows how cinema can do more than just relay a narrative", placing the film in camp with the work of the Black Independent Movement member's Charles Burnett, Haile Gerima and Julie Dash as he "upends cinematic conventions, and in doing so, he shows blackness in a way that is rarely seen on-screen"

Following the 91st Academy Awards nominations, Jason Parham of Wired argued Hale County This Morning, This Evenings inclusion for Best Documentary Feature signaled a "new age of documentary" in which "academy voters must now embrace their changing future."

Accolades  

AFI Docs 2018 
Champs-Élysées Film Festival 2018
Sheffield Doc/Fest 2018
Bildrausch Film Festival Basel 2018 - Special Mention International Competition 2018
Documental Ambulante 2018
Dok.fest International Documentary Film Festival Munich 2018
Sarasota Film Festival 2018
Montclair Film Festival 2018 - Winner Best Documentary Bruce Sinofsky Prize
San Francisco Film Festival 2018
New Directors/New Films 2018
Full Frame Documentary Film Festival 2018 - Winner Grand Jury Prize
CPH:DOX 2018
True/False Film Fest 2018
 Unorthodocs Film Festival 2018
Sundance Film Festival 2018 - Winner U.S. Documentary Special Jury Award for Creative Vision 
Independent Spirit Awards 2019 - Best Documentary Feature nominee 
Nominated for Best Documentary Feature at the 91st Academy Awards
Peabody Award 2019

See also
List of black films of the 2010s
Hale County, Alabama
Godfrey Reggio- whose Qatsi trilogy documentaries were the inspiration for this film

References

External links

Hale County This Morning, This Evening on IMDbHale County This Morning, This Evening on Independent Lens

2018 films
African Americans in Alabama
American documentary films
Documentary films about African Americans
Hale County, Alabama
Documentary films about Alabama
2010s English-language films
2010s American films
Films scored by Alex Somers